John Sinclair (born 29 June 1948) is a former Australian rules footballer who played with Essendon in the Victorian Football League (VFL). He was a member of Essendon's reserves premiership team in 1968 and played two senior VFL games in 1969.

Notes

External links 
		

Essendon Football Club past player profile	
		
		
		

Living people
1948 births
Australian rules footballers from Victoria (Australia)
Essendon Football Club players
Ballarat Football Club players